Fernando Suárez de Tangil y Angulo, 2nd Marquess of Covarrubias de Leyva, 4th Count of Vallellano (3 August 1886 – 6 September 1964) was a Spanish politician who served as Minister of Public Works of Spain between 1951 and 1957, during the Francoist dictatorship.

References

1886 births
1964 deaths
Public works ministers of Spain
Government ministers during the Francoist dictatorship